Alan Keith Branch (born December 29, 1984) is a former American football defensive tackle. He was drafted by the Arizona Cardinals in the second round of the 2007 NFL Draft and has also played for the Seattle Seahawks, Buffalo Bills, and New England Patriots. He played college football at Michigan.

Early years
Branch attended Cibola High School in Albuquerque, New Mexico. In addition to playing on the defensive line, Branch also played tight end as well as running back and punt returner in high school. He scored three rushing touchdowns and two receiving touchdowns in his senior season and five punt return touchdowns for his career.

Branch was a fairly highly regarded recruit coming out of high school, ranked as high as #6 nationally among defensive tackles.

Branch was also a three-year starter on the varsity basketball team, earning all-district honors as a sophomore and was second-team all-state as a junior.

High school awards
Selected to play in 2004 U.S. Army All-American Bowl
Gatorade Player of the Year in New Mexico
All-State as a junior and senior
 On May 3, 2017, Branch was inducted to the Cibola High School Hall of Fame

College career
Branch, along with fellow defensive all-star LaMarr Woodley, anchored one of the best defenses in college football in 2006.  He had 57 tackles, 17 tackles for loss, and nine sacks in 35 career games at Michigan.  He had his first interception and a fumble recovery against Ohio State on November 18, 2006. Branch played both defensive tackle and defensive end at Michigan.

He earned the following accolades while at Michigan:
2006 ESPN.com All-American Team
2006 All-Big Ten Conference First-team (coaches and media)

Professional career

Arizona Cardinals
Branch was drafted by the Arizona Cardinals with the 33rd overall pick in the second round of the 2007 NFL Draft. The Cardinals acquired the pick from the Oakland Raiders. In the 2008 NFL season, the Cardinals reached Super Bowl XLIII, but lost 27-23 to the Pittsburgh Steelers.

Seattle Seahawks

The Seattle Seahawks signed Branch to a two-year contract on July 28, 2011.

Buffalo Bills
Branch signed a one-year contract with the Buffalo Bills on April 2, 2013.

On December 23, 2013, Branch signed a multi-year contract extension with the Bills.

On August 24, 2014, one day after being arrested for a DUI, Branch was cut from the team.

New England Patriots
On October 21, 2014, it was reported that Branch had signed a 1-year deal with the New England Patriots. The team officially announced the signing on October 29. On February 1, 2015, Branch won his first Super Bowl, defeating his former team, the Seattle Seahawks, by a score of 28–24.

On March 15, 2015, Branch re-signed with the Patriots on a two-year deal worth a maximum of $6.6 million.

On November 21, 2016, Branch was notified that he was facing a four-game suspension for violating the league's policy on substance abuse but did not have to serve any games after the league rescinded the suspension before his appeal was even heard. Branch helped the Patriots win 14 games and earn the top seed for the AFC playoffs.

On February 5, 2017, Branch was part of the Patriots team that won Super Bowl LI. In the game, the Patriots defeated the Atlanta Falcons by a score of 34–28 in overtime. The Patriots trailed 28–3 in the third quarter, but rallied all the way back to win the game, which featured the first overtime game in Super Bowl history and the largest comeback in the Super Bowl. Branch recorded three tackles, 0.5 sacks, and a crucial fumble recovery in the game.

On March 9, 2017, Branch signed a two-year, $12 million contract extension with the Patriots. Branch played 12 games in the 2017 season and recorded 12 tackles. Branch was inactive for the playoffs, but the Patriots still made it to the Super Bowl without him only to fall to the Philadelphia Eagles in Super Bowl LII.

On March 6, 2018, the Patriots declined the option on Branch's contract, making him a free agent in 2018.

NFL career statistics

References

External links
New England Patriots bio
Buffalo Bills bio

1984 births
Living people
People from Rio Rancho, New Mexico
Players of American football from Albuquerque, New Mexico
African-American players of American football
American football defensive tackles
Michigan Wolverines football players
Arizona Cardinals players
Seattle Seahawks players
Buffalo Bills players
New England Patriots players
21st-century African-American sportspeople
20th-century African-American people
Sportspeople from Bernalillo County, New Mexico